Emerald Palace is the second studio album by the English multi-instrumentalist Duke Garwood. It was released by Butterfly Recordings on 27 March 2007.

Critical reception
The Guardian wrote that "it's like traditional country blues subjected to a barrage of 21st-century urban noise, with something of the guitar-improv abstractions of the late, great Derek Bailey thrown in." Drowned in Sound called the album "a bit of a shambles with fleeting moments of real joy."

Track listing

Personnel
 Duke Garwood - guitar, horns
 Simon Tong - bass guitar, banjo, guitar
 Paul May - drums

References

2007 albums
Blues albums by American artists